A. G. Pradeep (born 13 January 1987) is an Indian first-class cricketer who plays for Andhra Pradesh.

References

External links
 

1987 births
Living people
Indian cricketers
Andhra cricketers
Cricketers from Vijayawada